24Hours (Hangul: 24아워즈) is an independent South Korean alternative rock band formed 2011 in Seoul. The group consists of four members: Seungjin, Hyemi, Hyukjae and Eunhong. They debuted on March 3, 2012 with the single album Blackhole.

Career

Pre-debut
The members formed the band after they became an adult, but Seungjin(also known as Beautiful Jin) was a high school friend of some of the members of the band.Hyukjae joined the band as a friend of Seungjin as they were doing the same major in music.The name of the band was inspired from the group's musical endeavours at a 24 hour cafe where they discussed musical creations.

Influences
The band initially had british bands such as The Kooks as role models of the music the group is aiming for.The group also mentioned they were influenced by the American band The Strokes.

Members
Current
 Beautiful Jin (뷰리플진) — vocal, guitar
 Kim Hye-mi (김혜미) — lead guitar
 Kim Hyuk-jae (김혁재) — bass
 Min Eun-hong (민은홍) — drums 
Former
 Kang Ji-won (강지원) — drums

Discography

Studio albums

Extended plays

Single albums

Singles

References

External links
 24 Hours Official on YouTube

K-pop music groups
South Korean rock music groups
South Korean alternative rock groups
Musical groups from Seoul
Musical groups established in 2011
2011 establishments in South Korea
Musical quartets